Balyasny Asset Management is an American hedge fund headquartered in Chicago. Outside the U.S., it has additional offices in Canada, London and Asia.

Background 

Balyasny Asset Management was founded in 2001 in Chicago by Dmitry Balyasny, Scott Schroeder and Taylor O'Malley. It traded mostly long/short equity which today still accounts for 70% of the firm's risk.

For the first 16 years of its existence, it rarely lost money and delivered an annualized return of 12%. 

However in 2018, the firm experienced unprecedented significant difficulty, posting large performance losses, its assets under management dropping by half from $12 billion to $6 billion and client investors withdrawing their money from the firm. Balyasny himself send out an email to the firm's staff with the subject line  “Adapt or Die” that bluntly stated that "we are getting our butts kicked" and the firm's performance “sucks”. In the email he also stated he didn't feel a “palpable sense of urgency" on the trading floor and mentioned that investors were wondering if staff joined the firm "so they can enjoy not working too hard".  This email wound up in the hands of Kenneth C. Griffin, the founder and CEO of Citadel LLC. Balyasny Asset Management and Citadel LLC were hedge fund rivals as they were both based in Chicago at the time and spent a lot of money in a talent war where they would both try to poach each other's employees.  Griffin used this email in an internal town hall meeting for employees, telling them this was an example of what happens when a firm has poor culture. Balyasny Asset Management then cut 125 jobs which was around 20% of the firm's workforce. Balyasny has stated the mistakes in 2018 were caused by  undue caution and a tough environment for long/short equity. 

Since then, the firm underwent some significant changes including hiring a lot of new staff, changing the firm's risk management approach and transitioned to having more institutional investors as clients rather than high-net-worth individuals. By 2019, the firm was back into profitability. 

In February 2022, Balyasny stated the firm has been investing in private startups, a trend done by other hedge fund peers such as Tiger Global Management and Coatue Management. 

In March 2022, the firm announced it would create a new  equities unit called Corbets Capital with offices in New York and Greenwich, Connecticut.

As of May 2022, the firm has $15.7 billion assets under management and 1,100 employees which include 470 investment processionals.

Insider trading 

In 2010, Balyasny Asset Management was under investigation for connection to insider trading led by the Galleon Group. Mark Adams, an analyst at the firm was suspected of passing on insider information about EMC Corporation to Steven Fortuna, a money manager who plead guilty in the Galleon Group case.

References

External links
 

2001 establishments in Illinois
Financial services companies established in 2001
Hedge fund firms in Chicago
Investment management companies of the United States
Privately held companies based in Illinois